Burchia spectabilis is a species of sea snail, a marine gastropod mollusk in the family Pseudomelatomidae, first described by Alexander Sysoev and JohnTaylor in 1997.

This marine species occurs off Western Australia.

References

External links
 
 Burchia spectabilis, holotype in the Western Australian Museum

spectabilis
Gastropods described in 1997
Gastropods of Australia